Oxycopis is a genus of false blister beetles in the family Oedemeridae. There are about 17 described species in Oxycopis.

Species
These 17 species belong to the genus Oxycopis:

 Oxycopis barberi Arnett
 Oxycopis dietrichi (Arnett, 1951)
 Oxycopis falli (Blatchley, 1928)
 Oxycopis floridana (Horn, 1896)
 Oxycopis fuliginosa (LeConte, 1866)
 Oxycopis geayi Pic, 1935
 Oxycopis howdeni Arnett, 1965
 Oxycopis lemoulti (Pic, 1923)
 Oxycopis mariae (Arnett, 1951)
 Oxycopis mcdonaldi (Arnett, 1951)
 Oxycopis mimetica (Horn, 1896)
 Oxycopis nigripennis (Champion, 1890)
 Oxycopis nigroapicalis (Pic, 1924)
 Oxycopis notoxoides (Fabricius, 1801)
 Oxycopis suturalis (Horn, 1896)
 Oxycopis thoracica (Fabricius, 1801)
 Oxycopis vittata (Fabricius, 1775)

References

Further reading

External links

 

Oedemeridae
Tenebrionoidea genera
Articles created by Qbugbot